The Sunny Side of the Street is an album recorded by John Lithgow, released in 2006.

Track listing
Getting to Know You
On The Sunny Side
Pick Yourself up
Baby!
Be Human
Ya Gotta Have Pep
Everyone Says I Love You
Inka Dinka Doo
I Always Say Hello to a Flower
The Laughing Policeman
Song of the Sewer
I'm a Manatee
Lullaby in Ragtime

2006 albums